The Upper Plym Valley is an area of Dartmoor, Devon, England, particularly noted for a large array of archaeological sites ranging from prehistoric Drizzlecombe to 19th century Eylesbarrow Mine. It contains some 300 Bronze Age and medieval sites, covering 15 1⁄2 square kilometres (6 square miles) of Dartmoor landscape.

External links
Upper Plym Valley - English Heritage

English Heritage sites in Devon
Archaeological sites in Devon